Adriano Soares Martins (born June 12, 1982) is a Brazilian mixed martial artist currently competing in the Lightweight division of Taura MMA. A professional competitor since 2004, he has competed for the Ultimate Fighting Championship, Strikeforce and DREAM and Fight Nights Global.
Adriano

Background
Originally from Manaus, Brazil, Martins began training in Judo in 1994, which he continued with until the year 2000, reaching the rank of brown belt. Due to his desire to learn submissions, Martins began training in Brazilian Jiu-Jitsu in 1999. Martins went on to have an accomplished career in Brazilian Jiu-Jitsu, winning various titles. In 2004, needing to support his newly formed family, Martins began mixed martial arts.

Mixed martial arts career

Early career
Martins made his professional mixed martial arts debut in 2004 and compiled a 23–6 record on the Brazilian circuit before being signed by Strikeforce.

Strikeforce
Martins was scheduled to make his Strikeforce debut against Isaac Vallie-Flagg on September 29, 2012 at Strikeforce: Melendez vs. Healy. However, the event was cancelled due to an injury to headliner Gilbert Melendez.

Martins faced Jorge Gurgel on January 12, 2013 at Strikeforce: Marquardt vs. Saffiedine. He won the fight via unanimous decision.

Ultimate Fighting Championship
Martins made his promotional debut against Daron Cruickshank on November 9, 2013 at UFC Fight Night: Belfort vs. Henderson 2. He won via submission due to a straight armbar in the second round. The win also earned him his first Submission of the Night bonus award.

Martins faced Donald Cerrone on January 25, 2014 at UFC on Fox 10. He lost the fight via knockout in the first round.

As the first bout of his new four-fight contract, Martins faced promotional newcomer Juan Puig on July 6, 2014 at The Ultimate Fighter 19 Finale. He won the fight via knockout in the first round, after landing a short, counter right hand. The knockout earned him his first Performance of the Night bonus award.

Martins faced Rustam Khabilov on February 22, 2015 at UFC Fight Night 61.  He won the fight by split decision. In the fight, he was able to take and knock Khabilov down at the end of the second round.

Martins faced future UFC Lightweight Champion Islam Makhachev at UFC 192 on October 3, 2015. He won the fight via knockout in the first round, which produced a Performance of the Night bonus. 

Martins next faced Leonardo Santos on October 8, 2016 at UFC 204.  Santos was awarded a split decision victory.

Martins faced Kajan Johnson on September 9, 2017 at UFC 215. He lost the fight via knockout in the third round.

Martins was released from the UFC on November 15, 2017.

Post-UFC career
Martins was scheduled to face Rafael Alves at Titan FC 48 on February 16, 2018. However, the bout was cancelled for unknown reason.

Fight Nights Global
On 19 February 2018 he signed a six-fight deal with the Fight Nights Global. In his debut at FNG 87 on May 20, 2018, he lost to Alexandr Shabliy by unanimous decision.

Taura MMA
On September 2, 2020, news surfaced that Martins had signed a contract with Taura MMA.

Personal life
Adriano and his wife Andrezza have a daughter and a son.

Championships and accomplishments

Mixed martial arts
 Ultimate Fighting Championship
 Submission of the Night (One time) vs. Daron Cruickshank
 Performance of the Night (Two times) vs. Juan Puig and Islam Makhachev
Jungle Fight
Jungle Fight Interim Lightweight Championship (two times)
One successful title defense
Win Fight & Entertainment
WFE Lightweight Championship (one time)

Grappling
Brazilian jiu-jitsu
World Bronze Medallist (2006 black)
Two-time World Champion (2003 blue, 2004 open weight – purple)
CBJJO World Cup Silver Medallist (2005 light weight's absolute – brown)
Dumau Cup Champion (2008)
Dumau Cup Bronze Medallist (2008 open weight)

Mixed martial arts record

|-
| Loss
| align=center|28–12 (1)
| Carlos Silva
| Decision (unanimous)
| Copa Norte de MMA 2021 Finals
| 
| align=center|3
| align=center|5:00
| Manaus, Brazil
|
|-
| Loss
| align=center|28–11 (1)
| Kaynan Kruschewsky
| Decision (unanimous)
| Future FC 10
| 
| align=center|3
| align=center|5:00
| São Paulo, Brazil
|
|-
| NC
| align=center|28–10 (1)
| Adriano Rodrigues
| No Contest (accidental eye poke)
| Shooto Brasil 90
| 
| align=center|1
| align=center|N/A
| Rio de Janeiro, Brazil
|
|-
| Loss
| align=center|28–10
| Alexandr Shabliy
| Decision (unanimous)
| Fight Nights Global 87
| 
| align=center|3
| align=center|5:00
| Rostov-on-Don, Russia
|
|-
| Loss
| align=center|28–9
| Kajan Johnson
| KO (punch)
| UFC 215 
| 
| align=center|3
| align=center|0:49
| Edmonton, Alberta, Canada
|
|-
| Loss	
| align=center|28–8
| Leonardo Santos
| Decision (split)
| UFC 204
| 
| align=center|3
| align=center|5:00
| Manchester, England
|
|-
| Win	
| align=center|28–7
| Islam Makhachev
| TKO (punch)
| UFC 192
| 
| align=center|1
| align=center|1:46
| Houston, Texas, United States
| 
|- 
| Win	
| align=center| 27–7
| Rustam Khabilov
| Decision (split)
| UFC Fight Night: Bigfoot vs. Mir
| 
| align=center| 3
| align=center| 5:00
| Porto Alegre, Brazil
|
|-
| Win
| align=center| 26–7
| Juan Puig
| KO (punch)
| The Ultimate Fighter: Team Edgar vs. Team Penn Finale
| 
| align=center| 1
| align=center| 2:21
| Las Vegas, Nevada, United States
| 
|-
| Loss
| align=center| 25–7
| Donald Cerrone
| KO (head kick)
| UFC on Fox: Henderson vs. Thomson
| 
| align=center| 1
| align=center| 4:40
| Chicago, Illinois, United States
| 
|-
| Win
| align=center| 25–6
| Daron Cruickshank
| Submission (straight armbar)
| UFC Fight Night: Belfort vs. Henderson 2
| 
| align=center| 2
| align=center| 2:49
| Goiânia, Brazil
| 
|-
| Win
| align=center| 24–6
| Jorge Gurgel
| Decision (unanimous)
| Strikeforce: Marquardt vs. Saffiedine
| 
| align=center| 3
| align=center| 5:00
| Oklahoma City, Oklahoma, United States
| 
|-
| Win
| align=center| 23–6
| Jimmy Donahue
| TKO (punches)
| Jungle Fight 37
| 
| align=center| 1
| align=center| 1:02
| São Paulo, Brazil
| 
|-
| Win
| align=center| 22–6
| Neilson Gomes
| TKO (punches)
| Jungle Fight 34
| 
| align=center| 1
| align=center| 1:21
| Rio de Janeiro, Brazil
| 
|-
| Win
| align=center| 21–6
| Marcio Castanheira
| Submission (guillotine choke)
| Mr. Cage 6
| 
| align=center| 1
| align=center| N/A
| Manaus, Brazil
| 
|-
| Win
| align=center| 20–6
| Diego Braga Alves
| Decision (unanimous)
| WFE 10: Platinum
| 
| align=center| 5
| align=center| 5:00
| Salvador, Brazil
| 
|-
| Loss
| align=center| 19–6
| Francisco Trinaldo
| Decision (majority)
| Jungle Fight 30
| 
| align=center| 3
| align=center| 5:00
| Belém, Brazil
| 
|-
| Win
| align=center| 19–5
| Jamil Silveira
| TKO (punches)
| Mr. Cage 5
| 
| align=center| 2
| align=center| 2:19
| Manaus, Brazil
| 
|-
| Win
| align=center| 18–5
| Ronildo Augusto 
| TKO (punches)
| Jungle Fight 27
| 
| align=center| 1
| align=center| 2:54
| Brasília, Brazil
| 
|-
| Win
| align=center| 17–5
| Nilson Assunção
| TKO (corner stoppage)
| Jungle Fight 26
| 
| align=center| 1
| align=center| N/A
| São Paulo, Brazil
| 
|-
| Win
| align=center| 16–5
| Ronys Torres
| Decision (unanimous)
| Amazon Show Combat
| 
| align=center| 3
| align=center| 5:00
| Manaus, Brazil
| 
|-
| Win
| align=center| 15–5
| Pedro Irie
| Decision (split)
| MF 7: Rally Brazil
| 
| align=center| 3
| align=center| 5:00
| Itatiba, Brazil
| 
|-
| Win
| align=center| 14–5
| Dylan Clay
| Decision (unanimous)
| VTC: Brazil vs. USA
| 
| align=center| 3
| align=center| 5:00
| Manaus, Brazil
| 
|-
| Loss
| align=center| 13–5
| Jamil Silveira
| Decision (split)
| Vision Fight
| 
| align=center| 3
| align=center| 5:00
| Boa Vista, Brazil
| 
|-
| Win
| align=center| 13–4
| Daniel Trindade
| Decision (unanimous)
| Roraima Show Fight 5
| 
| align=center| 3
| align=center| 5:00
| Boa Vista, Brazil
| 
|-
| Win
| align=center| 12–4
| Luis Santos
| Decision (split)
| Hero's The Jungle 3
| 
| align=center| 3
| align=center| 5:00
| Manaus, Brazil
| 
|-
| Loss
| align=center| 11–4
| Keita Nakamura
| Decision (split)
| Dream 6
| 
| align=center| 2
| align=center| 5:00
| Saitama, Japan
| 
|-
| Loss
| align=center| 11–3
| Ronys Torres
| TKO (doctor stoppage)
| Hero's the Jungle 2
| 
| align=center| 2
| align=center| N/A
| Manaus, Brazil
| 
|-
| Win
| align=center| 11–2
| Diego Braga Alves
| Decision (unanimous)
| Amazon Challenge 2
| 
| align=center| 3
| align=center| 5:00
| Manaus, Brazil
| 
|-
| Win
| align=center| 10–2
| Michel Addario Bastos
| TKO (punches) 
| Hero's the Jungle
| 
| align=center| 1
| align=center| 4:24
| Manaus, Brazil
| 
|-
| Win
| align=center| 9–2
| Julian Fabrin 
| TKO (punches)
| Cassino Fight 4
| 
| align=center| 3
| align=center| 1:19
| Manaus, Brazil
| 
|-
| Win
| align=center| 8–2
| Luciano Azevedo
| Decision (split)
| Cassino Fight 3
| 
| align=center| 3
| align=center| 5:00
| Manaus, Brazil
| 
|-
| Win
| align=center| 7–2
| Steve Reyna
| Submission (rear-naked choke)
| Jungle Fight 6
| 
| align=center| 2
| align=center| 0:35
| Manaus, Brazil
| 
|-
| Win
| align=center| 6–2
| Daniel Trindade
| KO (knee)
| Roraima Kombat
| 
| align=center| 2
| align=center| 3:01
| Boa Vista, Brazil
| 
|-
| Win
| align=center| 5–2
| Jorge Clay
| TKO (punches)
| Amazon Ultimate Fight
| 
| align=center| 3
| align=center| 1:40
| Manaus, Brazil
| 
|-
| Win
| align=center| 4–2
| Daniel Trindade
| KO (punches) 
| Roraima Combat 1
| 
| align=center| 2
| align=center| N/A
| Boa Vista, Brazil
| 
|-
| Loss
| align=center| 3–2
| Gleison Tibau
| Decision (unanimous)
| Amazônia Fight 1
| 
| align=center| 3
| align=center| 5:00
| Manaus, Brazil
| 
|-
| Loss
| align=center| 3–1
| Boris Jonstomp
| Decision
| Jungle Fight 2
| 
| align=center| 3
| align=center| 5:00
| Manaus, Brazil
| 
|-
| Win
| align=center| 3–0
| Erick Cardoso
| Decision (unanimous)
| Gladiator of the Jungle 1
| 
| align=center| 1
| align=center| 10:00
| Manaus, Brazil
| 
|-
| Win
| align=center| 2–0
| Robert Fonseca
| KO (punches)
| Gladiator of the Jungle 1
| 
| align=center| 1
| align=center| 4:53
| Manaus, Brazil
| 
|-
| Win
| align=center| 1–0
| Lucas Lopes
| Decision (unanimous)
| Gladiator of the Jungle 1
| 
| align=center| 1
| align=center| 10:00
| Manaus, Brazil
|

See also
 List of current UFC fighters
 List of male mixed martial artists

References

External links
 
 

1982 births
Living people
People from Manaus
Brazilian male mixed martial artists
Brazilian practitioners of Brazilian jiu-jitsu
Brazilian male judoka
Welterweight mixed martial artists
Mixed martial artists utilizing boxing
Mixed martial artists utilizing Brazilian jiu-jitsu
Mixed martial artists utilizing judo
People awarded a black belt in Brazilian jiu-jitsu
Ultimate Fighting Championship male fighters
Sportspeople from Amazonas (Brazilian state)